Susan Schenk, sometimes Lovell-Schenk, (born 1954) is a New Zealand psychology academic. She is currently a full professor at the Victoria University of Wellington.

Academic career
After a 1982 PhD titled The substrate for prefrontal cortical self-stimulation: a psychophysical investigation at Concordia University, Schenk completed an NSERC funded post/doctoral position with Peter Milner at McGill University. She then moved to Texas A&M University where she moved through the ranks from assistant professor to professor. In 2001 she moved to the Victoria University of Wellington, as a full professor.

Most of her research relates to the physical and chemical aspects of drug abuse.

Selected works
 Horger, Brian A., Keith Shelton, and Susan Schenk. "Preexposure sensitizes rats to the rewarding effects of cocaine." Pharmacology Biochemistry and Behavior 37, no. 4 (1990): 707-711.
 Horger, Brian A., Melissa K. Giles, and Susan Schenk. "Preexposure to amphetamine and nicotine predisposes rats to self-administer a low dose of cocaine." Psychopharmacology 107, no. 2-3 (1992): 271–276.
 Schenk, Susan, Gary Lacelle, Kathleen Gorman, and Zalman Amit. "Cocaine self-administration in rats influenced by environmental conditions: implications for the etiology of drug abuse." Neuroscience Letters 81, no. 1-2 (1987): 227–231.
 Schenk, Susan, Brian A. Horger, Rachel Peltier, and Keith Shelton. "Supersensitivity to the reinforcing effects of cocaine following 6-hydroxydopamine lesions to the medial prefrontal cortex in rats." Brain Research 543, no. 2 (1991): 227–235.
 Schenk, Susan, Brian Partridge, and Toni S. Shippenberg. "U69593, a kappa-opioid agonist, decreases cocaine self-administration and decreases cocaine-produced drug-seeking." Psychopharmacology 144, no. 4 (1999): 339–346.

References

External links
  

Living people
1954 births
New Zealand women academics
Concordia University alumni
Academic staff of the Victoria University of Wellington
New Zealand psychologists
New Zealand women psychologists